Alan Moloney is an Irish film and television producer.

In 2001, alongside Michael Colgan, Alan produced Beckett on Film, a project aimed at making film versions of all nineteen of Samuel Beckett's stage plays.  Ten of the films were screened at the 2000 Toronto International Film Festival and some shown on Channel 4.  The series won the Best TV Drama award at the 6th The South Bank Show Award at the Savoy Theatre in London.  In 2006, Moloney worked with Harold Pinter to produce a TV adaptation of the stage play Celebration.

In 2007, Moloney produced Joe Strummer: The Future Is Unwritten, directed by Julien Temple. In the same year he also produced The Escapist, which premiered at the Sundance Film Festival. In 2008, he produced A Film with Me in It, and in 2009, Triage and Perrier's Bounty.

Moloney has been responsible for TV dramas in Ireland and the UK including Kingdom and The Clinic.

References

External links

Living people
Irish film producers
Irish television producers
Year of birth missing (living people)